The 2006 OMV ADAC Rallye Deutschland was the ninth round of the 2006 World Rally Championship season. It took place between August 11-13, 2006.

Results

Special Stages
All dates and times are CEST (UTC+2).

External links
 Results at eWRC.com
 Results at Jonkka's World Rally Archive

Rallye Deutschland, 2006
Deutschland
Rallye Deutschland